Max Robert Franz Abbé (28 November 1874 – 12 January 1936) was a German gymnast and architect. He competed in the 1900 Summer Olympics.

References

External links

1874 births
1936 deaths
Gymnasts at the 1900 Summer Olympics
German male artistic gymnasts
Olympic gymnasts of Germany
Sportspeople from Brandenburg